Guided Tour is a collection of science fiction stories by American writer Gordon R. Dickson.  It was first published by Tor Books in 1988.  Most of the stories originally appeared in the magazines Fantasy and Science Fiction, Astounding, Planet Stories, Analog Science Fiction and Fact, Future, Science Fiction Stories, If, Galaxy Science Fiction, Imagination, Fantastic Universe and Fantastic Story Magazine.

Contents

 "Guided Tour"
 "The Monkey Wrench"
 "The Star Fool"
 "Hilifter"
 "Counter-Irritant"
 "Last Voyage"
 "An Ounce of Emotion"
 "Rehabilitated"
 "Lulungomeena"
 "Time Grabber"
 "I’ve Been Trying to Tell You"
 "Flat Tiger"
 "The Rebels"
 "The Mousetrap"

References

1988 short story collections
Short story collections by Gordon R. Dickson
Tor Books books